The 1928 United States presidential election in Kansas took place on November 6, 1928, as part of the 1928 United States presidential election which was held throughout all contemporary 48 states. Voters chose ten representatives, or electors to the Electoral College, who voted for president and vice president.

Kansas voted for the Republican nominee, Secretary of Commerce Herbert Hoover of California, over the Democratic nominee, Governor Alfred E. Smith of New York. Hoover's running mate was Senate Majority Leader Charles Curtis of Kansas, while Smith ran with Senator Joseph Taylor Robinson of Arkansas. Hoover won the state by a margin of 44.96%.

Smith only carried Ellis County, which had (and still has) a large percentage of Roman Catholic residents. Smith was the first Roman Catholic to earn the nomination of a major party for president.

With 72.02% of the popular vote, Kansas would prove to be Hoover's strongest state in the 1928 presidential election in terms of popular vote percentage.

Results

Results by county

See also
 United States presidential elections in Kansas

References

Kansas
1928
1928 Kansas elections